Brigadier General Kjell Eugenio Laugerud García (24 January 1930 –  9 December 2009) was a Guatemalan military officer who served as the 36th President of Guatemala from 1974 until 1978. He was the son of a Norwegian father and a Guatemalan mother.

Biography
Laugerud received part of his military training in the United States, attending classes at Fort Benning, Georgia, and at Command and General Staff College, Fort Leavenworth, Kansas. He served as Guatemalan delegate to the Inter-American Defense Board between 1968 and 1970.

Laugerud had been chief of the army staff and defence minister under President Carlos Arana since 1972, then was elected president in a March 1974 vote that was marred by violence and charges of fraud.  His candidature had been endorsed by both the military-backed Institutional Democratic Party and the far right National Liberation Movement. During his term, Guatemala experienced a disastrous earthquake in 1976, and had continuing disputes with neighbouring Belize. In 1977, after the Carter administration published a report critical of the human rights situation in Guatemala, Laugerud announced that the country would no longer accept US military aid. Guatemala did in fact receive funds that had already been appropriated for that year, and later turned to other nations, such as Israel, Spain, Belgium, Sweden, Taiwan, and Yugoslavia for military aid and arms supplies.

Just before the end of his term, Laugerud was also faced with the consequences of a stand-off between Kekchi Indians and the military in Panzós, in which 53 unarmed civilians were killed by the Army, and another 47 were wounded.

In 1983, Laugerud and three other ex-presidents were forced to retire from the army.

References

External links
Capsule biography  From Rulers.org; search for "Laugerud"
Guatemala Memoria del Silencio Historical Clarification Commission (Guatemala's Truth Commission) on 1971-78 (in Spanish) 
INAUGURATION OF NEW PRESIDENT OF GUATEMALA, AP Archive, 2 July 1974

Presidents of Guatemala
People of the Guatemalan Civil War
Guatemalan generals
Institutional Democratic Party politicians
National Liberation Movement (Guatemala) politicians
People from Guatemala City
Guatemalan people of Norwegian descent
1930 births
2009 deaths
Guatemalan anti-communists
Defense Ministers of Guatemala
Non-U.S. alumni of the Command and General Staff College